Hillenburg is a German surname. It may have originated as a variant spelling of Hallenberg, a habitational surname referring to Hallenberg, North Rhine-Westphalia, Germany. Variant spellings of the surname include Hellenberg. The 2010 United States Census found 555 people with the surname Hillenburg, making it the 39,607th-most-common name in the country. This represented an increase from 519 people (39,824th-most-common) in the 2000 Census. In both censuses, roughly 95% of the bearers of the surname identified as non-Hispanic white, and 2.3% as Hispanic or Latino of any race.

Notable people with the surname include:

Andy Hillenburg (born 1963), American racecar driver
Rolf Kalmuczak (1938–2007), German crime novelist who sometimes used the pen name Martin Hillenburg
Stephen Hillenburg (1961–2018), American animator who created the SpongeBob SquarePants series

References

German-language surnames